In 1983, Facets Multi-Media founded the Chicago International Children's Film Festival (CICFF), the first competitive festival of films for children in the U.S. The impetus for the Festival came from a need to introduce new, culturally diverse films for children to American children's audiences, and to recognize excellence in children's filmmaking. In addition, the Festival sought to empower children by involving them directly in the jurying process. From its inception, the Festival has had independent juries of children and adult media professionals awarding prizes in multiple categories.

The Chicago International Children's Film Festival is the largest annual festival of films for children (ages 2–16) in the world, programming 250 films and videos from 40 countries. With 25,000 children, adults and educators and over 100 filmmakers, programmers and celebrities each year, the Festival  is one of the only Academy Award-qualifying children's film festivals. The Festival is held every October at various theatrical venues around Chicago, Illinois.

Activities
Facets Kids Film Camp
Year-round Screenings
Facets Children's Programs feature year-round screenings for parents and groups, presenting unique multicultural short films for children as catalysts for improving fundamental skills such as literacy, writing, critical thinking and inference. 
Dream Screen
Dream Screen is a workshop that teaches children to create their own stories and to animate them using drawn and cutout animation. Students from underserved communities participate in all aspects of video production: writing and storyboarding, drawing, art making, and camerawork.

References

External links
Chicago International Children's Film Festival

Film festivals in Chicago
Children's film festivals in the United States